Hari Baba Ashram or Hari Ram Baba Samadhi  is a religious site for the devotees of Saint Shri Hari Baba.  It is situated in Sikar district of Rajasthan. 

Hari Baba Ashram (हरिबाबा आश्रम) attracts thousands of Rajasthani worshipers throughout the year.  On Chaitra Purnima, large Jagaran are organized every year where more than 2 to 3 thousands of people assemble here to pay their homage to the deity. Hari Baba Ashram Samiti looks after the management of the Ashram and the fairs.  The Ashram of Sri Hari Baba is situated right in the north of the Bidsar Village.

Location 
Bidsar is a part of the Sikar district Sikar in Rajasthan, and it is situated on the Nawalgarh to Laxmangarh Road in Bidsar (Chatrana Johra) approximately 35 kilometers from Sikar, 8 kilometers from Nawalgarh, and 22 kilometers from Laxmangarh. Bidsar lies under the jurisdiction of the Bidasar Panchayat Samiti and is well connected with Sikar by a regular bus service run by the Rajasthan State Road Transport Corporation. Indian Airlines and Jet Air fly to Jaipur, from where Bidsar is 3.3 hours drive via a taxi or a bus.

References

Ashrams